Seth Van Neerden (born 1968) is a former national record-holding swimmer and national team member from the United States.  He competed at the 1995 Pan American Games, where he won three gold medals: as part of the American team's winning 4×100-meter medley relay, and for winning the 100- and 200-meter breaststroke events. He received a bronze medal at the 1993 FINA Short Course World Championships.

Van Neerden also won several U.S. national titles in his career. At the 1994 U.S. Nationals he tied the American Record in the 100m breaststroke, with a time of 1:01.40.  This record would stand for two years. He finished in the top 20 world rankings for the 100 breaststroke every year from 1990 to 1996.  Swimming coach Jack Nelson, who trained Van Neerden in the early and mid 1990s, stated "Seth Van Neerden is America's finest breaststroker."

Van Neerden now coaches high school swimming in his hometown of Wilmington, Delaware.

See also
 World record progression 4 × 100 metres medley relay

References

External links
 

1968 births
Living people
American male breaststroke swimmers
World record setters in swimming
Medalists at the FINA World Swimming Championships (25 m)
Pan American Games gold medalists for the United States
Swimmers at the 1995 Pan American Games
American people of Dutch descent
Pan American Games medalists in swimming
Medalists at the 1995 Pan American Games